John Hess (born 12 March 1955 in Solihull) is a television political journalist for the BBC in the East Midlands.

Early life
He attended Solihull School. At school, in a December 1972 play, he portrayed Robert Faulconbridge in King John (play).

Career
He started his career on evening newspapers in Coventry and Birmingham. The general election he first covered was that in February 1974.

BBC
His first job for the BBC was at Radio Nottingham.

He was a political journalist for Midlands based in Birmingham. He worked on The Midlands at Westminster on BBC2.

He became the Political Editor for the BBC's East Midlands Today in 1997. He presented the East Midlands segment for The Politics Show, in co-operation with Marie Ashby. There were 45 MPs in the region that he covered. He was based at the BBC Centre on London Road (A60) in Nottingham. He retired from East Midlands Today in 2015.

Personal life
He was married in Solihull in 1982.

References

External links
 BBC East Midlands blog
 View from the Trent - former blog
 Biography
 Older profile at BBC East Midlands
 Twitter
 Politics Show in the East Midlands
 BBC College of Journalism in 2010
 Parliamentary Press Gallery

BBC newsreaders and journalists
British political journalists
People from the Metropolitan Borough of Solihull
People educated at Solihull School
Politics of the East Midlands
1955 births
Living people